Aiden Mesias (born 23 October 1999) is an English professional footballer who plays as a midfielder for USL League One club Forward Madison.

Career
Mesias played for Charlton Athletic from the ages of 9 to 12 before spending six years with Queens Park Rangers. In November 2019, Mesias joined USL Championship club Hartford Athletic. On 20 July 2020, Mesias made his professional debut, coming on for the final three minutes in a 3–1 victory over Loudoun United.

On 1 February 2022, Mesias joined Regionalliga Südwest side SSV Ulm 1846 on a deal until the end of the season after a successful trial period.

Mesias signed with Forward Madison of USL League One on 18 January 2023.

Personal life
Mesias grew up in Camden Town. He was born to a Filipino father and a Timorese mother. His father grew up in Germany where he played lower division football.

References

External links

Profile at USL Championship

Living people
1999 births
Association football midfielders
English footballers
Hartford Athletic players
USL Championship players
USL League One players
English expatriate footballers
Queens Park Rangers F.C. players
English expatriate sportspeople in the United States
Expatriate soccer players in the United States
Footballers from Greater London
Expatriate footballers in Germany
English expatriate sportspeople in Germany
SSV Ulm 1846 players
English people of Filipino descent
English people of East Timorese descent
Forward Madison FC players